Lah is a locality in the Wimmera region of  Victoria, situated between Warracknabeal and Brim on the Henty Highway.

References

External links

Towns in Victoria (Australia)
Wimmera